Sigunga is an administrative ward in Uvinza District of Kigoma Region in Tanzania. 
In 2016 the Tanzania National Bureau of Statistics report there were 12,335 people in the ward, from 20,455 in 2012. Prior to 2014 the Herembe village was a part of Siguna Ward before it split off to form the Herembe Ward.

Villages / neighborhoods 
The ward has 2 villages and 16 hamlets.

 Kaparamsenga
 Itiga Mashariki
 Itigi/Kapara Kaskazini
 Itigi/Kapara Magharibi
 Itigi/Kapara Magharibi
 Kaparamsenga Kusini
 Kaparamsenga Mashariki
 Lusambo
 Pungu
 Sigunga
 Kagwena
 Kahama
 Kahwibili
 Katale
 Kiboko
 Kichangani
 Mgangasima
 Sigoma

References

Wards of Kigoma Region